The Crowell Trust (full name: The Henry Parsons Crowell and Susan Coleman Crowell Trust) is a charitable foundation in the United States which states that it "is dedicated to the teaching and active extension of the doctrines of Evangelical Christianity".  It has funded a television program opposing evolution, which television station KNME refused to broadcast.

The foundation was established in 1927 by American businessman Henry Parsons Crowell, who was founder of the Quaker Oats Company, but not himself a Quaker. The foundation makes grants to various organizations in order to promote Evangelical Christianity.

References

1927 establishments in the United States
Christian charities based in the United States
Charities based in Colorado